Kokowääh is a 2011 German film directed by Til Schweiger. It was released in German-speaking countries (Germany, Austria, South Tyrol and Switzerland) on 3 February 2011. The film stars Til Schweiger, his daughter Emma Schweiger, Jasmin Gerat and Samuel Finzi. Another of Schweiger's daughters, Luna Schweiger, makes a small appearance in the film. Kokowääh is an onomatopoetic depiction of the French pronunciation of coq au vin. A sequel, Kokowääh 2, was released on 7 February 2013 with Schweiger having returned as director, co-writer and producer.

Plot 
Kokowääh is set in Berlin and Potsdam. The plot concerns the travails of Henry (Til Schweiger), an established author of fiction, who must deal with the emergence of his eight-year-old natural daughter Magdalena (Emma Schweiger), the previously unknown product of a one-night indiscretion in Stockholm. In the meantime, he is also working on the adaptation of a famous best–selling novel and reconciling with his ex–girlfriend Katharina (Jasmin Gerat), with whom he is working on the adaptation. Little Magdalena, still in the state of shock, loves her foster father Tristan (Samuel Finzi) more than the biological one. Throughout the film, Henry and Magdalena build a close relationship, which he eventually describes in his script "Kokowääh" (referring to the French meal "Coq au vin").

Cast

Production 
Kokowääh was filmed in Berlin and Potsdam from 21 July to 13 September 2010. The budget was estimated to be €5,650,000. Director and lead actor Til Schweiger and Béla Jarzyk, who also produced the film, wrote the script in a Turkish hotel in Berlin.

Critical reception 
Kokowääh received the Golden Screen Award, which is given to films that have been watched by more than 3 million viewers. It was the most successful film in Germany in the first half of 2011. The film itself received generally good to mixed reviews. Andreas Scheiner of weekly magazine Die Zeit found the film "light and entertaining", though he added it "lacked depth". Dieter Oßwald of the Programmkino.de praised the film as a "strong–point daddy–comedy". Andrea Butz of public radio station WDR2, however, criticized the film for "one–dimensional leaps and drawn characters". Jan Füchtjohann of the Süddeutsche Zeitung also criticized Kokowääh, writing it showed "over long distances like a commercial for yogurt". Boyd van Hoeij described the film in his review for Variety as a ″series of mismatched-duo cliches spun out across a two-hour-plus running time" with ″a pretty decent if unoriginal 80-minute film hiding somewhere in this bloated two-hour-plus exercise″. His prediction: ″Though its $38 million haul makes it Germany's highest grosser of 2011 so far, biz beyond central Europe, Schweiger's only base, will again be minimal."

Other media

Music 
The soundtrack album for Kokowääh was released on 4 February 2011 on iTunes and Amazon.com through Sony Music. The lead single "Stay" by British synthpop band Hurts was released on 4 February in Germany, reaching number three at the German singles chart and achieving gold certification. The music video for "Stay" has two versions, the regular one and the one that features parts from Kokowääh.

Home media 
Kokowääh was released on both DVD and Blu-ray on 19 August 2011 on iTunes and Amazon.com.

Release dates

References

External links 
 Official website (archived)
 

2011 films
2011 comedy films
German comedy films
2010s German-language films
Films directed by Til Schweiger
Films scored by Martin Todsharow
Films set in Berlin
Films about screenwriters
Warner Bros. films
2010s German films